João Pessoa Cavalcanti de Albuquerque (24 January 1878 – 26 July 1930) was the governor of Paraíba between 1928 and 1930.

Life and career
Pessoa was born on January 24, 1878, at Umbuzeiro, Paraíba, Brazil. He enrolled at the Military Academy of Praia Vermelha in 1895, but dropped out before completing the course. He joined the Faculdade de Direito do Recife (Faculty of Law of Recife) in 1899, graduating in 1904. From 1909, he worked as a lawyer in Rio de Janeiro, in the Ministry of Finance and the Navy. In 1919, Epitácio Pessoa, João Pessoa's uncle, became President of Brazil, and João was made a minister of the Supremo Tribunal Militar (Supreme Military Court).

In 1928, João Pessoa was elected governor of Paraíba, in which role he attempted to bring about reform of the state's political and administrative structure, and imposed taxes on trade conducted between Paraíba and the port of Recife. In the 1930 presidential elections, Pessoa refused to support the Republican candidate, Júlio Prestes, and accepted an invitation to become the running mate on the ticket of Getúlio Vargas. Prestes won the election, and one of his supporters, Colonel José Pereira Lima, led a revolt against Pessoa's state government, with the cooperation of the federal government. Pessoa responded by ordering raids on the homes and offices of suspected rebel sympathizers; during one such raid on the house of João Duarte Dantas, an ally of Pereira, police discovered intimate letters from Dantas' mistress, which were subsequently published in the state press.

Death
On July 26, 1930, Pessoa was on an official visit to Recife when he was shot and killed by an infuriated Dantas. The assassination stirred up a wave of bad feeling toward the federal government and the outgoing president Washington Luís, who was accused of bearing the "moral responsibility". Not long after Pessoa's death, Washington Luís was overthrown, and Getúlio Vargas installed as president.

Legacy
The state capital, formerly Paraíba, was renamed João Pessoa in September 1930. Pessoa is also commemorated in the Paraíba state flag, which features the word Nego ("I deny"), a reference to Pessoa's refusal to accept Júlio Prestes as president. The colors of the flag, red and black, symbolize the blood shed during the assassination and the period of mourning which followed.

References

People from Paraíba
1878 births
1930 deaths
Cavalcanti family
Brazilian murder victims
Assassinated Brazilian politicians
People murdered in Brazil
Deaths by firearm in Brazil

Candidates for Vice President of Brazil